Jesús Sánchez was a Mexican fencer. He competed in the team foil event at the 1932 Summer Olympics.

References

External links
 

Year of birth missing
Year of death missing
Mexican male foil fencers
Olympic fencers of Mexico
Fencers at the 1932 Summer Olympics